The 2001 Georgia Tech Yellow Jackets football team represented the Georgia Institute of Technology in the 2001 NCAA Division I-A football season. The team's coach was George O'Leary, who would leave the school before the bowl game to accept the head coaching job at the University of Notre Dame. It played its home games at Bobby Dodd Stadium in Atlanta.

Preseason
Coming off of three strong seasons (including 3 straight New Year's Day bowl appearances and 3 wins over the archrival Georgia Bulldogs), the Jackets were expected to contend for the national championship in 2001. In 2000, quarterback George Godsey had picked up where his predecessor Joe Hamilton had left off, passing for 2,906 yards and 23 touchdowns (against just 6 interceptions). Armed with targets like Kelly Campbell for his senior season, a number of preseason magazines named Godsey to 1st Team All-ACC honors, and pundits predicted that a loaded Georgia Tech team would win the Atlantic Coast Conference title with the departure of many key players from the defending champion Florida State Seminoles.

Schedule

Roster

Coaching staff
 George O'Leary, head coach
 Bill O'Brien, offensive coordinator, quarterbacks coach
 Ted Roof, defensive coordinator

References

Georgia Tech
Georgia Tech Yellow Jackets football seasons
Seattle Bowl champion seasons
Georgia Tech Yellow Jackets football